Reginald George Wilson (1888–1959) was an English professional golfer. He had some success both before and after World War I.

Wilson twice finished in the top-10 in the Open Championship, finishing tied for 7th place in 1912 and in 6th place in 1914. He played for England against Scotland in 1913, winning both his matches.

Wilson enjoyed considerable success in the News of the World Match Play. He reached the semi-final stage in both 1912 and 1913. In 1912 he lost 7&5 to Harry Vardon, while in 1913 he lost 4&3 to George Duncan. Wilson won the tournament in 1923 at Walton Heath Golf Club  beating Thomas Renouf 4&2  in the final and winning the first prize of £200. He reached the semi-final for the fourth time in 1926, losing to 58-year-old Sandy Herd by 1 hole.

Wilson was originally at Berkhamsted Golf Club but moved to Croham Hurst Golf Club in 1913 where he stayed until at least 1939.

His son Reginald William George Wilson (1908–1993) was also a professional golfer and played in the 1929 and 1933 Open Championships.

Professional wins
1923 News of the World Match Play

Results in major championships

Note: Wilson only played in The Open Championship.

NT = No tournament
CUT = missed the half-way cut
"T" indicates a tie for a place

Team appearances
England–Scotland Professional Match (representing England): 1913 (winners)

References

English male golfers
People from Bushey
1888 births
1959 deaths